Boris Nikolayevich Lagutin (24 June 1938 – 4 September 2022) was a Soviet light middleweight boxer. During his career as a boxer, he won 241 fights and lost only 11. He won medals in three Olympic Games, including two golds, in 1964 and 1968. Lagutin also won at European championships in 1961 and 1963 and at USSR championships in 1959, 1961–64 and 1968. Lagutin was born in Moscow. Until 1967 he trained at VSS Trud, then - at VSS Spartak. During the period of failures, that followed the 1964 Olympics, Lagutin was removed from the USSR team roster. Along with his trainer Vladimir Trenin Lagutin managed to find causes of his losses and earned USSR and Olympic Champion titles again in 1968.

Olympic results
Rome - 1960
 Round of 32: Bye
 Round of 16: Defeated Alhassan Brimah (Ghana) by KO
 Quarterfinal: Defeated John Bukowski (Australia) by RSC
 Semifinal: Lost to Wilbert McClure (U.S.A.) by decision, 2-3

Tokyo - 1964
 Round of 32: Defeated Paul Hogh (Unified Team of Germany) by decision, 5-0
 Round of 16: Defeated Jose Chirino (Argentina) by disqualification
 Quarterfinal: Defeated Eddie Davies (Ghana) by walkover
 Semifinal: Defeated Józef Grzesiak (Poland) by decision, 4-1
 Final: Defeated Joseph Gonzales (France) by decision, 4-1

Mexico - 1968
 Round of 32: Defeated Moisés Fajardo (Spain) by RSC
 Round of 16: Defeated Sayed El-Nahas (Egypt) by RSC
 Quarterfinal: Defeated Ion Covaci (Romania) by decision, 5-0
 Semifinal: Defeated Günther Meier (West Germany) by decision, 4-1
 Final: Defeated Rolando Garbey (Cuba) by decision, 5-0

Honours and awards
 Order of Merit for the Fatherland, 3rd and 4th classes
 Order of the Red Banner of Labour
 Order of Friendship of Peoples
 Order of the Badge of Honour
 Medal "For Labour"
 Medal "In Commemoration of the 850th Anniversary of Moscow"
 Honoured Master of Sports

References

 Britannica article on Boris Lagutin
  Biography

1938 births
2022 deaths
Martial artists from Moscow
Olympic boxers of the Soviet Union
Olympic gold medalists for the Soviet Union
Olympic bronze medalists for the Soviet Union
Boxers at the 1960 Summer Olympics
Boxers at the 1964 Summer Olympics
Boxers at the 1968 Summer Olympics
Spartak athletes
Recipients of the Order "For Merit to the Fatherland", 3rd class
Recipients of the Order "For Merit to the Fatherland", 4th class
Recipients of the Order of the Red Banner of Labour
Recipients of the Order of Friendship of Peoples
Honoured Masters of Sport of the USSR
Olympic medalists in boxing
Russian male boxers
Medalists at the 1968 Summer Olympics
Medalists at the 1964 Summer Olympics
Medalists at the 1960 Summer Olympics
Burials in Troyekurovskoye Cemetery
Moscow State University alumni
Light-middleweight boxers